Leandro Lencinas (born 6 March 1995) is an Argentine professional footballer who plays as a forward for Huracán Las Heras.

Career
Lencinas had youth spells with Fénix de Rivadavia and Godoy Cruz. He was promoted into the first-team of Argentine Primera División side Godoy Cruz in 2018, midway through the 2017–18 season. He was an unused substitute for a victory over Chacarita Juniors on 26 January, before making his professional debut on 2 February during a goalless draw with Patronato. He featured a total of fifteen times up until July 2019, when the forward was loaned to Mitre of Primera B Nacional. His first appearance came against Ferro Carril Oeste on 8 September, before netting his first senior goal versus Barracas Central on 2 October.

On 6 August 2020, having recently ended his contract with Godoy Cruz, Lencinas signed an eighteen-month contract with Torneo Federal A's Huracán Las Heras.

Career statistics
.

References

External links

1995 births
Living people
Sportspeople from Mendoza Province
Argentine footballers
Association football forwards
Argentine Primera División players
Primera Nacional players
Godoy Cruz Antonio Tomba footballers
Club Atlético Mitre footballers